Mats Lie Skåre (Mats Lie Skare) a.k.a. Slipmats is a Norwegian songwriter and music producer.

Discography

References

 http://www.nrk.no/nyheter/distrikt/hedmark_og_oppland/1.6784897

Norwegian songwriters
Living people
Year of birth missing (living people)